Odean is a given name and surname. Notable people with the name include:

Given name
Odean Brown (born 1982), Jamaican cricketer
Odean Pope (born 1938), American jazz saxophonist
Odean Skeen (born 1994), Jamaican sprinter
Odean Smith (born 1996), Jamaican cricketer

Surname
Terrance Odean, American economist

See also
Odeon (disambiguation)